Bacchus, Ceres en Venus is a 1686 Dutch-language pastoral opera by Johan Schenck.

It is one of the earliest surviving Dutch-language operas, 8 years after with Carolus Hacquart's De triomfeerende Min (1678).

 The libretto was by Govert Bidloo an Amsterdam regent, physician and poet. A large number of selections from the opera were published as Schenk's Op.1 in 1687 enabling a reconstruction as the basis for a recording by Camerata Trajectina in 2011.

The opera had its (rather late) premiere in Utrecht at the "Festival voor oude muziek" in 2011.
The production was directed by Marc Krone and featured Bernard Loonen as Mercurius, Hieke Meppelink as Cerus, Jasper Schweppe as Bacchus, and Renate Arends as Venus.

References

Dutch-language operas
1686 operas